Computo (Danielle Foccart), is a character appearing in media published by DC Comics, primarily as a member of the "Batch SW6" group of the Legion of Super-Heroes in the 30th century. She is the younger sister of Jacques Foccart, who joined the Legion as the second Invisible Kid.

Fictional character biography
Danielle is a native of Earth, from what was onceCôte d'Ivoire. As a preteen, she was afflicted with a life-threatening neurological disorder which appeared to be untreatable. As a last resort, her older brother Jacques brought her to Brainiac 5 for treatment, and he rashly decided to utilize a piece of circuitry from the dismantled supercomputer Computo, which he had created years earlier. Still surviving as an artificial intelligence, Computo promptly possessed Danielle's body, and took control of Legion headquarters and the city of Metropolis, nearly killing several Legionnaires. To save Danielle and the others, Jacques drank Lyle Norg's invisibility serum and gained the original Invisible Kid's powers. Although the A.I.'s control of Legion HQ was broken, it maintained possession of Danielle's body.  Brainiac 5 devoted most of his free time for at least a year to curing Danielle's disorder and exorcizing Computo. Eventually, he succeeded at both tasks. A healthy and apparently normal Danielle returned to the Foccart home in Côte d'Ivoire.

"Five Years Later"
During the "Five Year Gap" following the Magic Wars, the Legion disbanded and Earth's government fell under the covert control of the Dominators, who had attempted to conquer the planet in the 20th century.  Earth withdrew from the United Planets, and the government gradually became more repressive. At some point, Danielle was kidnapped by the Dominators, along with other humanoids possessing superpowers. Eventually she was freed and reunited with Jacques, who had become the leader of a resistance cell which included himself, Tyroc, and the former members of the Legion of Substitute Heroes. Soon thereafter, Danielle (now a teenager) became associated with the members of the Dominators' highly classified "Batch SW6". This was a group of teenage Legionnaire clones, created from samples apparently taken just prior to Ferro Lad's death at the hands of the Sun-Eater. By that time, Danielle had, through unspecified means, acquired the ability to communicate with and control computers by psionically interfacing with them.

Although the Dominators were eventually defeated, Earth was destroyed just days later in a disaster reminiscent of the destruction of Krypton over a millennium earlier. A few dozen cities and their inhabitants survived, and the planet was reconstituted as New Earth.  The SW6 Legionnaires remained on New Earth, and Danielle joined their ranks. She soon became deputy leader, under Cosmic Boy.

Post-Zero Hour
After Legion continuity was completely rebooted by Zero Hour, Jacques was recast as a close childhood friend of Lyle Norg, who spent much of his time with the Foccart family. A young girl who is presumably Danielle appears in one panel in Legionnaires #66 (December 1998). She does not exhibit any superpowers. Danielle made no further appearances in the Post-Zero Hour or "Threeboot" eras of Legion continuity.

Post-Infinite Crisis
The events of the Infinite Crisis miniseries have restored a close analogue of the Pre-Crisis Legion to continuity, as seen in "The Lightning Saga" story arc in Justice League of America and Justice Society of America, and in the "Superman and the Legion of Super-Heroes" story arc in Action Comics.  While an adult Jacques has been depicted, Danielle has yet to be seen. However, the original Danielle (in her guise as Computo) was seen briefly when multiple versions of the Legion battled Superboy-Prime, the Time Trapper and the Legion of Super-Villains.

References

DC Comics superheroes
DC Comics metahumans
DC Comics characters who have mental powers
DC Comics telepaths
Fictional technopaths
Characters created by Keith Giffen
Comics characters introduced in 1982
African superheroes